Cladiella krempfi is a species of soft coral in the family Alcyoniidae. It is found in the western Indo-Pacific and was first described by the British zoologist Sydney John Hickson in 1919.

Secondary metabolites
Four unusual diterpenes with novel pyran rings have been found in this soft coral, and these compounds also accumulate in the tissues of the nudibranch Tritoniopsis elegans that feeds on the coral.

References

Alcyoniidae
Animals described in 1919